Prime F. Osborn III Convention Center is a  convention center located in downtown Jacksonville, Florida. Opened in 1986, it was built incorporating Jacksonville Terminal Complex / Union Station as well as several thousand square feet of newly built structure.

Located in the Jacksonville neighborhood of LaVilla, the Prime Osborn contains two exhibition halls totaling , several ballrooms and meetings rooms. The City of Jacksonville is looking to replace the Prime Osborn within the next decade, with a larger 500,000+ square foot convention center in downtown Jacksonville. The JTA Skyway's LaVilla station is located across the street.

History

LaVilla, at that time a suburb of Jacksonville, was for many years an important railroad hub. The first union station in the area was built by the Savannah, Florida and Western Railway (later part of the Atlantic Coast Line Railroad) in 1883. The Jacksonville, Tampa and Key West Railway (also later part of the ACL) began to use it in 1884. Other terminals served the Florida Central and Peninsular Railroad (later part of the Seaboard Air Line Railroad), the Florida East Coast Railway, and the Georgia Southern and Florida Railway.

The company was incorporated in 1894 by Henry Flagler, who owned the Florida East Coast Railway. Its first Union Depot opened on February 4, 1895, and was completed on January 15, 1897. It came to be known as the Flagler Depot. Ownership was split between five railroad companies, Atlantic Coast Line Railroad, Florida East Coast Railway, and Seaboard Air Line Railroad each with 25% ownership, Southern Railway and Georgia Southern and Florida Railway each with 12.5% ownership.

When the second Union Station opened in 1919 (on the site of the original one), it was the largest railroad station in the South. At its peak, the terminal handled as many as 142 trains and 20,000 passengers a day. Some of the passenger trains handled in Jacksonville were 18 to 22 railcars long. Within the terminal, there was a restaurant, snack bars, news stands, a barber shop, florist, a drug store, and gift shops. The Jacksonville terminal had 32 tracks. 29 of those tracks were passenger tracks with platforms. Of those, 1-15 were stub or "head" tracks, which ended at the bumper posts. (Some of these massive decorative concrete posts still stand within the Convention Center Concourse).

The station was last used on January 3, 1974; Amtrak moved to a new smaller station on the Northside. In 1982, a public-private partnership was started, led by former CSX chairman Prime F. Osborn III. The new convention center opened on October 17, 1986.

Future and proposed projects
First Coast Commuter Rail is a proposed passenger rail system serving Jacksonville and the Northeast Florida region. It is currently in the early planning stages. Three routes were analyzed in depth: north to Yulee, southwest to Green Cove Springs, FL, and southeast to St. Augustine, FL.

Brightline is a inter-city passenger rail system between Miami and West Palm Beach with an under-construction extension to Orlando. Jacksonville is a likely expansion point for the near future, as the FEC Railway already owns the tracks running there.

See also
Architecture of Jacksonville
List of convention centers in the United States
Northeast Florida Commuter Rail

References

Railroad History Database
JTA Commuter Rail Plan
FEC Passenger Railway Plan

External links
 
Prime F. Osborn III Convention Center

Atlantic Coast Line Railroad stations
Seaboard Air Line Railroad stations
Stations along Southern Railway lines in the United States
Former Amtrak stations in Florida
Former Atlantic Coast Line Railroad stations
Former Florida East Coast Railway stations
Former Seaboard Air Line Railroad stations
Former Southern Railway (U.S.) stations
Railway stations on the National Register of Historic Places in Florida
Jacksonville
Buildings and structures in Jacksonville, Florida
Economy of Jacksonville, Florida
Convention centers in Florida
Tourist attractions in Jacksonville, Florida
Beaux-Arts architecture in Florida
Downtown Jacksonville
LaVilla, Jacksonville
National Register of Historic Places in Jacksonville, Florida
Architecture in Jacksonville, Florida
Event venues on the National Register of Historic Places in Florida
1986 establishments in Florida
Railway stations closed in 1974
Railway stations in the United States opened in 1894
Railway stations in the United States opened in 1919